Natural Force is the second studio album by Welsh singer Bonnie Tyler, released in May 1978 by RCA Records. In the United States, the album was titled It's a Heartache. As with her debut, Ronnie Scott and Steve Wolfe wrote most of the tracks on the album. David Mackay again produced the album, with Scott and Wolfe. Other songs include covers of American artists Stevie Wonder and Carole King.

Five singles were released from Natural Force. The second single, "It's a Heartache", is among the best-selling singles of all time, with sales of over 6 million copies. It became Tyler's first charting single in the United States, where it was certified gold by the Recording Industry Association of America (RIAA). Many other singles from Natural Force also fared well in Europe.

Natural Force became Tyler's most successful album for RCA. In the United States, it reached number 2 on the Top Country Albums chart, and number 16 on the Billboard 200. The album was also a success in Europe, but like its predecessor, it failed to chart in the United Kingdom.

Background 
Tyler began recording songs for Natural Force in 1977, which resulted in the release of "Heaven" following her debut album The World Starts Tonight in February of the same year. Natural Force sustained the style of its predecessor, with pop rock songs composed by Tyler's producers and managers, Ronnie Scott and Steve Wolfe, and the addition of a small number of covers. Natural Force became the best-selling of her four albums with RCA Records, with over 500,000 copies sold in the United States.

Singles 
"Heaven" was released as the album's lead single in July 1977. The song was criticised for having "less impact" than her previous singles. It was only a hit in Germany, where it reached number 24. Phil Hendricks of Cherry Red Records suggested that the death of Elvis Presley on 16 August 1977 may have been a contributing factor to the song's lack of success, due to the diversion of RCA's promotional capabilities.

"It's a Heartache" became the second single from Natural Force in November 1977. Tyler's raspy vocal quality had her compared to Rod Stewart, with critics viewing the song as superior to "Lost in France". "It's a Heartache" was a commercial success, selling over 6 million copies worldwide, establishing itself among of the best-selling singles of all time. The song became Tyler's first hit in the United States, reaching number three on the Billboard Hot 100. It also reached number four in the United Kingdom, and number one hit in countries such as Canada, France and Norway.

"Here Am I" was released as the third single from Natural Force on 7 April 1978. The song was not as commercially successful as "It's a Heartache", only charting in Germany and Norway. Record Mirror stated that the song lacked the "irresistible hook of "It's a Heartache"."

"Hey Love (It's a Feelin')" was released as the fourth single in June 1978, and failed to chart worldwide.

"If I Sing You a Love Song" was released as the fifth and final single from Natural Force in August 1978, and only reached number 103 on the Billboard Hot 100.

Track listing

Personnel 
Bonnie Tyler - vocals
 Roger Bara — keyboards
 Kevin Dunn — bass
 Mike Gibbins — drums, percussion
 Peter King — background vocals
 David MacKay — engineer
 Ray Taff Williams — guitar, background vocals
 Taff Williams — acoustic guitar, electric guitar, background vocals
 Steve Wolfe — acoustic guitar, electric guitar, background vocals

Charts

Certifications

References 

1978 albums
Bonnie Tyler albums
Albums produced by David Mackay (producer)
RCA Records albums